St Dunstan's School is a secondary school in Glastonbury, Somerset, England. The school is for students between the ages of 11 and 16 years. It is named after St. Dunstan, an abbot of Glastonbury Abbey, who went on to become Archbishop of Canterbury in 960AD.

The school was a 'new-build' in 1958 with major building work, at a cost of £1.2 million, in 1998, adding the science block and the sports hall. It was designated as a specialist Arts College in 2004 and the £800,000 spent at this time paid for the Performing Arts studio and facilities to support pupils with special educational needs. In 2011, the school became an academy.

On 1 June 2016, St Dunstans joined the Midsomer Norton Schools Partnership. under head, Mr K Howard. Since St Dunstans joined the Midsomer Norton Schools Partnership it has undergone significant refurbishment as part of an ongoing programme to ensure the school has an inspiring environment, with modern facilities to support high quality learning. Teaching is enhanced through collaborative working to share best practise, allowing students to access new activities and events across the MAT partnership.

In July 2018 for the first time in the history of St Dunstans school, Ofsted inspectors graded the school 'good' in all categories. Inspectors said ‘The headteacher, trust and senior leaders have transformed St Dunstan’s; it provides a good quality of education and students are safe.’ They are ‘highly ambitious for the school, each pupil and the community.’ This report comes two years after the school was put into Special Measures.

Notable former pupils
 Gary Stringer, leader singer of Reef

References

External links 

Academies in Somerset
Glastonbury
Secondary schools in Somerset
1958 establishments in England
Educational institutions established in 1958